Golf, for the 2013 Island Games, took place at the Port Royal Golf Course in Southampton Parish, Bermuda. The competition ran from 15 to 18 July 2013.

Medal table
 Bermuda 2013 IG Golf Medal Tally

Medal summary

Men

Women

References

Island Games
2013 Island Games
2013